Journey to the Urge Within is the debut album by English saxophonist Courtney Pine. It was released on the Verve label in 1986.

Reception
Allmusic awarded the album with 4 stars and its review by Scott Yanow states: "This early Courtney Pine recording (the tenor saxophonist was 22 at the time) features some of the most promising black English jazz musicians of the time, including Pine (who also plays some bass clarinet and soprano), singer Cleveland Watkiss (who often is reminiscent of Bobby McFerrin), vibraphonist Orphy Robinson, and pianist Julian Joseph."

The album went on to reach #39 in the UK Albums Chart and earned a silver disc (over 250,000 copies sold), which was unprecedented at the time for a British jazz recording.

Track listing
All compositions by Courtney Pine except where noted.
 "Miss Interpret" – 4:15 
 "I Believe" – 4:36
 "Peace" (Horace Silver) – 5:20
 "Dolores" (Wayne Shorter) – 3:29
 "As We Would Say" – 3:19
 "Children of the Ghetto" (Chris Amoo, Eddie Amoo) – 7:02
 "When, Where, How and Why" – 5:20
 "C.G.C." – 3:31
 "Seen" – 4:28
 "Sunday Song" – 1:27
 "E.F.P." – 3:45
 "Big Nick" (John Coltrane) – 4:35

Charts

Personnel
 Courtney Pine – tenor saxophone on tracks 3,6,7,9, soprano saxophone on tracks 1,2,4,10, Leblanc bass clarinet on tracks 5,8
 Ray Carless – baritone saxophone on tracks 1,7
 Kevin Robinson – trumpet on tracks 5,7
 Julian Joseph – piano on tracks 1-4,6,7,9,10
 Roy Carter – producer and keyboards on "Children of the Ghetto"
 Orphy Robinson – vibraphone on tracks 1,7
 Martin Taylor – guitar on "Children of the Ghetto"
 Gary Crosby – bass guitar
 Mark Mondesir – drums on tracks 1-7,9
 Ian Mussington - percussion on "Children of the Ghetto"
 Susaye Greene – vocals on "Children of the Ghetto"
 Cleveland Watkiss – vocals on tracks 1,7,8
Technical
John Timperley, Pete Brown - engineer
Billy Banks - executive producer
David Hiscock - photography

References

1986 debut albums
Courtney Pine albums
Albums produced by Michael Cuscuna
Verve Records albums